I-351 may refer to:

 , a class of tanker/transport submarines built for the Imperial Japanese Navy during World War II
 , an Imperial Japanese Navy submarine commissioned in January 1945 and sunk in July 1945